Spatalla is a genus containing 20 species of flowering plants, commonly known as "spoons", in the family Proteaceae. The genus is endemic to the Cape Floristic Region of South Africa where it is associated with fynbos habitats. The species are all small shrubs. The name is derived from the Greek, meaning “wantonness”, alluding to the plants’ unusually large pollen-presenters. Most species are threatened.

Species
Described species are listed below, with their conservation status:

 Spatalla argentea Rourke – Silver-leaf spoon – EN
 Spatalla barbigera Salisb. ex Knight – Fine-leaf spoon – NT
 Spatalla caudata (Thunb.) R.Br. – Woolly-hair spoon – EN
 Spatalla colorata Meisn. – Shiny spoon – EN
 Spatalla confusa (E.Phillips) Rourke – Long-tube spoon – LC
 Spatalla curvifolia Salisb. ex Knight – White-stalked spoon – NT
 Spatalla ericoides E.Phillips – Erica-leaf spoon – EN
 Spatalla incurva (Thunb.) R.Br. – Swan-head spoon – LC
 Spatalla longifolia Salisb. ex Knight – Pink-stalked spoon – NT
 Spatalla mollis R.Br. – Woolly spoon – Rare
 Spatalla nubicola Rourke – Medusa spoon – NT
 Spatalla parilis Salisb. ex Knight – Spike spoon – LC
 Spatalla prolifera (Thunb.) Salisb. ex Knight – Palmiet spoon – EN
 Spatalla propinqua R.Br. – Lax spoon – EN
 Spatalla racemosa (L.) Druce – Lax-stalked spoon – NT
 Spatalla salsoloides (R.Br.) Rourke – Kink-style spoon – CR
 Spatalla setacea (R.Br.) Rourke – Needle-leaf spoon – LC
 Spatalla squamata  Meisn. – Silky spoon – NT
 Spatalla thyrsiflora Salisb. ex Knight – Swan-neck spoon – VU
 Spatalla tulbaghensis (E.Phillips) Rourke – Shaggy-hair spoon – EN

Gallery

References

 
Proteaceae genera
Endemic flora of South Africa
Flora of the Cape Provinces